Prediction Productions is Neil Patrick Harris' production company.  It also was one of the production companies involved with Best Time Ever with Neil Patrick Harris. Harris has a deal with NBC to work on new projects through Prediction Productions as well.

References

Entertainment companies of the United States
Mass media companies of the United States